Scary Muzak is the thirteenth studio album by the Norwegian experimental electronica band Ulver, released in 2021 on October 31 (Halloween). The album is heavily inspired by soundtracks from 1970s and 1980s horror movies, with five out of the twelve songs on the album incorporating music from the soundtrack to John Carpenter's 1978 film Halloween.

Track listing

Personnel
 Kristoffer Rygg – percussion
 Ole Alexander Halstensgård – electronics
 Tore Ylwizaker - synthesizer
 Stian Westerhus - guitar

References

External links

2021 albums
Ulver albums